Modern pentathlon was one of the many sports which was held at the 1994 Asian Games in Mihara, Hiroshima, Japan on 9 to 11 October 1994.

Kim Myung-kun of South Korea won the gold medal in individual competition while Kazakhstan won the team event over South Korea and Kyrgyzstan.

Medalists

Medal table

Participating nations
A total of 16 athletes from 6 nations competed in modern pentathlon at the 1994 Asian Games:

References
 Results

External links
International Pentathlon Federation

 
1994 Asian Games events
1994
Asian Games
1994 Asian Games